Events from the year 1678 in Denmark.

Incumbents 
 Monarch – Christian V
 Grand Chancellor – Frederik Ahlefeldt

Events

Scanian War 
 18 January – Battle of Warksow, the Swedish navy defeats the forces of Denmark-Norway and Brandenburg-Prussia.
 22–24 September – Invasion of Rügen, the allied forces of Denmark-Norway and Brandenburg-Prussia occupy Rügen.

Births 
 24 June – Ulrik Christian Gyldenløve, Count of Samsø, admiral and illegitimate son of Christian V (died 1719)

Deaths 
 5 October – Hedevig Ulfeldt, daughter of king Christian IV (born 1626)

References 

 
Denmark
Years of the 17th century in Denmark